Austin Stark (born May 31, 1979) is an American film director, writer, and producer best known for films highlighting social issues, from mental illness in Infinitely Polar Bear to his latest medical drama The God Committee. 
Stark made his writing and directorial debut with The Runner (2015), a political drama that follows a Louisiana congressman in the aftermath of the 2010 BP Oil Spill. The movie stars Nicolas Cage, Sarah Paulson, Connie Nielsen, and Peter Fonda. It was released in theaters nationwide on August 7, 2015 by Alchemy.

His film, Infinitely Polar Bear was nominated for the 73rd Golden Globe Awards under the category Best Actor - comedy. Stark's most recent film is The God Committee, a medical thriller touching upon the subject of organ transplant. The film both written and directed by him premiered at the 2021 Tribeca Film Festival and was released theatrically by Vertical Entertainment in July 2021.

Austin is one of the founding partners of Paper Street Films, a film production company based in New York City.

Career
He began his career in 2007 working with Academy Award winning producer Martin Richards (Chicago). Since then, Austin has produced and directed a number of films, including:

 The God Committee (2021), starring Kelsey Grammer, Julia Stiles, Colman Domingo, Janeane Garofalo and Dan Hedaya.
 The Runner (2015), starring Nicolas Cage, Connie Nielsen, Peter Fonda and Sarah Paulson. 
 Infinitely Polar Bear (2015), starring Mark Ruffalo and Zoe Saldana;
 Hello I Must Be Going (2012), nominated for the Grand Jury Prize at the 2012 Sundance Film Festival;
 Tony Kaye's Detachment (2011), starring Adrien Brody; 
 Happythankyoumoreplease (2010), winner of the Audience Award at the 2010 Sundance Film Festival;
 Werner Herzog's My Son, My Son, What Have Ye Done? (2009);
 Peter and Vandy (2009), nominated for the Grand Jury Prize at the 2009 Sundance Film Festival.

Personal life
Stark is a graduate of Georgetown University. where he studied literature.

Filmography

References

External links 
 
 PaperStreetFilms.com

American film producers
American film directors
Georgetown College (Georgetown University) alumni
Living people
1979 births